Wrestling was contested by men and women at the 2014 Asian Games in Dowon Gymnasium, Incheon, South Korea from September 27 - October 1, 2014.

Schedule

Medalists

Men's freestyle

Men's Greco-Roman

Women's freestyle

Medal table

Participating nations 
A total of 239 athletes from 30 nations competed in wrestling at the 2014 Asian Games:

References

External links
Official website

 
2014
Asian Games
2014 Asian Games events
International wrestling competitions hosted by South Korea